Blackwater River is a  river in Baldwin County, Alabama.  The Blackwater River originates at  near Loxley, and discharges into the Perdido River at  near Lillian.

References

Rivers of Alabama
Rivers of Baldwin County, Alabama